Chatchai Koompraya (born April 3, 1984), or simply known as Chai, is a Thai professional footballer who plays as an midfielder for Thai League 1 club Chainat Hornbill.

Club career

External links
 Profile at Goal
https://es.soccerway.com/players/chatchai-koompraya/287711/

1984 births
Living people
Chatchai Koompraya
Chatchai Koompraya
Association football midfielders
Chatchai Koompraya
Chatchai Koompraya
Chatchai Koompraya
Chatchai Koompraya